Hamza Testouri (born 30 August 1987) is a Tunisian football defender.

References

1987 births
Living people
Tunisian footballers
ES Beni-Khalled players
CS Sfaxien players
EGS Gafsa players
ES Métlaoui players
AS Gabès players
JS Kairouan players
EO Sidi Bouzid players
Olympique Béja players
Association football defenders
Tunisian Ligue Professionnelle 1 players